William Comyns Beaumont, also known as Comyns Beaumont and Appian Way, (17 October 1873 – 30 December 1955) was a British author, journalist, lecturer, and editor. Beaumont was a staff writer for the Daily Mail and eventually became editor of the Bystander in 1903 and then The Graphic in 1932.

Beaumont's astronomical speculations were later mirrored by Immanuel Velikovsky's works.

Family 
Beaumont was the uncle of the British actress Muriel Beaumont, mother of writers Angela du Maurier and Daphne du Maurier, and the painter Jeanne du Maurier.

Theories 
Beaumont accepted the existence of giants based on British folklore, and argued other mythological creatures were actually real.

In Facts and Fallacies (1988) published by Reader's Digest, Beaumont's views are summarized:

He was also a proponent of the Shakespeare authorship question, arguing Shakespeare's plays were written by Francis Bacon.

Works
The Riddle of the Earth (written under the name of Appian Way), Chapman & Hall, London (or Brentano's, New York), 1925, OCLC 1517479
The Mysterious Comet: Or the Origin, Building up, and Destruction of Worlds, by means of Cometary Contacts, Rider & Co., London, 1932, OCLC 8997586
The Riddle of Prehistoric Britain, Rider & Co., London, 1946 (Kessinger Publishing Co., 1997)
Britain, the Key to World History, Rider & Co., London, 1947
The Private Life of the Virgin Queen, self-published, 1947, OCLC 601691
A Rebel in Fleet Street, Hutchinson & Co., London, 1948 (or 1944) (his autobiography)
The Great Deception Rediscovered by the Comyns Beaumont Archive in 2015.  Previously referenced as After Atlantis: the Greatest Story Never Told (a title bestowed by Robert Stephanos) in Eccentric Lives, Peculiar Notions, John Michell, 2002, pp. 136–143)

Further reading
Eccentric Lives and Peculiar Notions, John Michell, (1984), Thames & Hudson.

References

Troubled Times: William Comyns Beaumont
Troubled Times: Beaumont & Velikovsky
Cambridge Conference Correspondence

1873 births
1956 deaths
Daily Mail journalists
British conspiracy theorists
Shakespeare authorship theorists
Atlantis proponents
Pseudohistorians
British newspaper editors
British magazine editors